Marxism is a left-wing to far-left method of socioeconomic analysis that uses a materialist interpretation of historical development, better known as historical materialism, to understand class relations and social conflict and a dialectical perspective to view social transformation. It originates from the works of 19th-century German philosophers Karl Marx and Friedrich Engels. As Marxism has developed over time into various branches and schools of thought, no single, definitive Marxist theory exists.

In addition to the schools of thought which emphasize or modify elements of classical Marxism, various Marxian concepts have been incorporated and adapted into a diverse array of social theories leading to widely varying conclusions. Alongside Marx's critique of political economy, the defining characteristics of Marxism have often been described using the terms dialectical materialism and historical materialism, though these terms were coined after Marx's death and their tenets have been challenged by some self-described Marxists.

Marxism has had a profound impact on global academia, having influenced many fields, including anthropology, archaeology, art theory, criminology, cultural studies, economics, education, ethics, film theory, geography, historiography, literary criticism, media studies, philosophy, political science, political economy, psychology, science studies, sociology, urban planning, and theatre.

Overview 

Marxism seeks to explain social phenomena within any given society by analysing the material conditions and economic activities required to fulfill human material needs. It assumes that the form of economic organisation, or mode of production, influences all other social phenomena, including broader social relations, political institutions, legal systems, cultural systems, aesthetics and ideologies. These social relations and the economic system form a base and superstructure. As forces of production (i.e. technology) improve, existing forms of organising production become obsolete and hinder further progress. Karl Marx wrote: "At a certain stage of development, the material productive forces of society come into conflict with the existing relations of production or—this merely expresses the same thing in legal terms—with the property relations within the framework of which they have operated hitherto. From forms of development of the productive forces these relations turn into their fetters. Then begins an era of social revolution."

These inefficiencies manifest themselves as social contradictions in society which are, in turn, fought out at the level of class struggle. Under the capitalist mode of production, this struggle materialises between the minority who own the means of production (the bourgeoisie) and the vast majority of the population who produce goods and services (the proletariat). Starting with the conjectural premise that social change occurs due to the struggle between different classes within society who contradict one another, a Marxist would conclude that capitalism exploits and oppresses the proletariat; therefore, capitalism will inevitably lead to a proletarian revolution. In a socialist society, private property—as the means of production—would be replaced by cooperative ownership. A socialist economy would not base production on the creation of private profits but on the criteria of satisfying human needs—that is, production for use. Friedrich Engels explained that "the capitalist mode of appropriation, in which the product enslaves first the producer, and then the appropriator, is replaced by the mode of appropriation of the products that is based upon the nature of the modern means of production; upon the one hand, direct social appropriation, as means to the maintenance and extension of production—on the other, direct individual appropriation, as means of subsistence and of enjoyment."

Marxian economics and its proponents view capitalism as economically unsustainable and incapable of improving the population's living standards due to its need to compensate for the falling rate of profit by cutting employees' wages and social benefits while pursuing military aggression. The socialist mode of production would succeed capitalism as humanity's mode of production through revolution by workers. According to Marxian crisis theory, socialism is not an inevitability but an economic necessity.

Etymology 
The term Marxism was popularised by Karl Kautsky, who considered himself an orthodox Marxist during the dispute between Marx's orthodox and revisionist followers. Kautsky's revisionist rival Eduard Bernstein also later adopted the term.

Engels did not support using Marxism to describe either Marx's or his views. He claimed that the term was being abusively used as a rhetorical qualifier by those attempting to cast themselves as genuine followers of Marx while casting others in different terms, such as Lassallians. In 1882, Engels claimed that Marx had criticised self-proclaimed Marxist Paul Lafargue by saying that if Lafargue's views were considered Marxist, then "one thing is certain and that is that I am not a Marxist."

Historical materialism 

Marxism uses a materialist methodology, referred to by Marx and Engels as the materialist conception of history and later better known as historical materialism, to analyse the underlying causes of societal development and change from the perspective of the collective ways in which humans make their living. Marx's account of the theory is in The German Ideology (1845) and the preface A Contribution to the Critique of Political Economy (1859). All constituent features of a society (social classes, political pyramid and ideologies) are assumed to stem from economic activity, forming what is considered the base and superstructure. The base and superstructure metaphor describes the totality of social relations by which humans produce and re-produce their social existence. According to Marx, the "sum total of the forces of production accessible to men determines the condition of society" and forms a society's economic base.

The base includes the material forces of production such as the labour, means of production and relations of production, i.e. the social and political arrangements that regulate production and distribution. From this base rises a superstructure of legal and political "forms of social consciousness" that derive from the economic base that conditions both the superstructure and the dominant ideology of a society. Conflicts between the development of material productive forces and the relations of production provoke social revolutions, whereby changes to the economic base lead to the superstructure's social transformation.

This relationship is reflexive in that the base initially gives rise to the superstructure and remains the foundation of a form of social organization. Those newly formed social organizations can then act again upon both parts of the base and superstructure so that rather than being static, the relationship is dialectic, expressed and driven by conflicts and contradictions. Engels clarified: "The history of all hitherto existing society is the history of class struggles. Freeman and slave, patrician and plebeian, lord and serf, guild-master and journeyman, in a word, oppressor and oppressed, stood in constant opposition to one another, carried on uninterrupted, now hidden, now open fight, a fight that each time ended, either in a revolutionary reconstitution of society at large, or in the common ruin of the contending classes."

Marx considered recurring class conflicts as the driving force of human history as such conflicts have manifested as distinct transitional stages of development in Western Europe. Accordingly, Marx designated human history as encompassing four stages of development in relations of production:
 Primitive communism: cooperative tribal societies.
 Slave society: development of tribal to city-state in which aristocracy is born.
 Feudalism: aristocrats are the ruling class, while merchants evolve into the bourgeoisie.
 Capitalism: capitalists are the ruling class who create and employ the proletariat.

In a letter to the editor of the Russian newspaper paper  (1877), he explained that his ideas were based upon a concrete study of the actual conditions in Europe.

Criticism of capitalism 

According to the Marxist theoretician and revolutionary socialist Vladimir Lenin, "the principal content of Marxism" was "Marx's economic doctrine." Marx demonstrated how the capitalist bourgeoisie and their economists were promoting what he saw as the lie that "the interests of the capitalist and of the worker are ... one and the same." He believed that they did this by purporting the concept that "the fastest possible growth of productive capital" was best for wealthy capitalists and workers because it provided them with employment.

Exploitation is a matter of surplus labour—the amount of labour performed beyond what is received in goods. Exploitation has been a socioeconomic feature of every class society and is one of the principal features distinguishing the social classes. The power of one social class to control the means of production enables its exploitation of other classes. Under capitalism, the labour theory of value is the operative concern, whereby the value of a commodity equals the socially necessary labour time required to produce it. Under such conditions, surplus value—the difference between the value produced and the value received by a labourer—is synonymous with surplus labour, and capitalist exploitation is thus realised as deriving surplus value from the worker.

In pre-capitalist economies, exploitation of the worker was achieved via physical coercion. Under the capitalist mode of production, workers do not own the means of production and must "voluntarily" enter into an exploitative work relationship with a capitalist to earn the necessities of life. The worker's entry into such employment is voluntary because they choose which capitalist to work for. However, the worker must work or starve. Thus exploitation is inevitable, and the voluntary nature of a worker participating in a capitalist society is illusory; it is production, not circulation, that causes exploitation. Marx emphasised that capitalism per se does not cheat the worker.

Alienation (German: Entfremdung) is the estrangement of people from their humanity and a systematic result of capitalism. Under capitalism, the fruits of production belong to employers, who expropriate the surplus created by others and generate alienated labourers. In Marx's view, alienation is an objective characterization of the worker's situation in capitalism—his or her self-awareness of this condition is not prerequisite.

In addition to criticism, Marx has also praised some of the results of capitalism stating that it "has created more massive and more colossal productive forces than have all preceding generations together" and that it "has put an end to all feudal, patriarchal arrangements."

Social classes 

Marx distinguishes social classes based on two criteria, i.e. ownership of means of production and control over the labour power of others. Following this criterion of class based on property relations, Marx identified the social stratification of the capitalist mode of production with the following social groups:
 Proletariat: "[T]he class of modern wage labourers who, having no means of production of their own, are reduced to selling their labour power in order to live." The capitalist mode of production establishes the conditions that enable the bourgeoisie to exploit the proletariat as the worker's labour generates a surplus value greater than the worker's wage.
 Lumpenproletariat: the outcasts of society, such as the criminals, vagabonds, beggars, or prostitutes, without any political or class consciousness. Having no interest in national, let alone international, economic affairs, Marx claimed that this specific sub-division of the proletariat would play no part in the eventual social revolution.
 Bourgeoisie: those who "own the means of production" and buy labour power from the proletariat, thus exploiting the proletariat. They subdivide as bourgeoisie and the petite bourgeoisie.
 Petite bourgeoisie: those who work and can afford to buy little labour power (i.e. small business owners, peasants, landlords and trade workers). Marxism predicts that the continual reinvention of the means of production eventually would destroy the petite bourgeoisie, degrading them from the middle class to the proletariat.
 Landlords: a historically significant social class that retains some wealth and power.
 Peasantry and farmers: a scattered class incapable of organizing and effecting socioeconomic change, most of whom would enter the proletariat while some would become landlords.
Class consciousness denotes the awareness—of itself and the social world—that a social class possesses and its capacity to act rationally in its best interests. Class consciousness is required before a social class can effect a successful revolution and, thus, the dictatorship of the proletariat.

Without defining ideology, Marx used the term to describe the production of images of social reality. According to Engels, "ideology is a process accomplished by the so-called thinker consciously, it is true, but with a false consciousness. The real motive forces impelling him remain unknown to him; otherwise it simply would not be an ideological process. Hence he imagines false or seeming motive forces."

Because the ruling class controls the society's means of production, the superstructure of society (i.e. the ruling social ideas) is determined by the best interests of the ruling class. In The German Ideology, Marx says that "[t]he ideas of the ruling class are in every epoch the ruling ideas, i.e. the class which is the ruling material force of society, is, at the same time, its ruling intellectual force." The term political economy initially referred to the study of the material conditions of economic production in the capitalist system. In Marxism, political economy is the study of the means of production, specifically of capital and how that manifests as economic activity.

This new way of thinking was invented because socialists believed that common ownership of the means of production (i.e. the industries, land, wealth of nature, trade apparatus and wealth of the society) would abolish the exploitative working conditions experienced under capitalism. Through working class revolution, the state (which Marxists saw as a weapon for the subjugation of one class by another) is seized and used to suppress the hitherto ruling class of capitalists and (by implementing a commonly owned, democratically controlled workplace) create the society of communism which Marxists see as true democracy. An economy based on cooperation on human need and social betterment, rather than competition for profit of many independently acting profit seekers, would also be the end of class society, which Marx saw as the fundamental division of all hitherto existing history.

Marx saw work, the effort by humans to transform the environment for their needs, as a fundamental feature of humankind. Capitalism, in which the product of the worker's labour is taken from them and sold at the market rather than being part of the worker's life, is therefore alienating to the worker. Additionally, the worker is compelled by various means (some nicer than others) to work harder, faster, and longer. While this is happening, the employer is constantly trying to save on labour costs by paying the workers less and figuring out how to use cheaper equipment. This allows the employer to extract the largest amount of work and, therefore, potential wealth from their workers. The fundamental nature of capitalist society is no different from that of a slave society in that one small group of society exploits the larger group.

Through common ownership of the means of production, the profit motive is eliminated, and the motive of furthering human flourishing is introduced. Because the surplus produced by the workers is the property of the society as a whole, there are no classes of producers and appropriators. Additionally, as the state originates in the bands of retainers hired by the first ruling classes to protect their economic privilege, it will wither away as its conditions of existence have disappeared.

Communism, revolution and socialism 

According to The Oxford Handbook of Karl Marx, "Marx used many terms to refer to a post-capitalist society—positive humanism, socialism, Communism, realm of free individuality, free association of producers, etc. He used these terms completely interchangeably. The notion that 'socialism' and 'Communism' are distinct historical stages is alien to his work and only entered the lexicon of Marxism after his death."

According to orthodox Marxist theory, overthrowing capitalism by a socialist revolution in contemporary society is inevitable. While the inevitability of an eventual socialist revolution is a controversial debate among many different Marxist schools of thought, all Marxists believe socialism is a necessity. Marxists argue that a socialist society is far better for most of the populace than its capitalist counterpart. Prior to the Russian Revolution, Vladimir Lenin wrote: "The socialization of production is bound to lead to the conversion of the means of production into the property of society. ... This conversion will directly result in an immense increase in productivity of labour, a reduction of working hours, and the replacement of the remnants, the ruins of small-scale, primitive, disunited production by collective and improved labour." The failure of the 1905 Russian Revolution, along with the failure of socialist movements to resist the outbreak of World War I, led to renewed theoretical effort and valuable contributions from Lenin and Rosa Luxemburg towards an appreciation of Marx's crisis theory and efforts to formulate a theory of imperialism.

Schools of thought

Classical 

Classical Marxism denotes the collection of socio-eco-political theories expounded by Karl Marx and Friedrich Engels. As Ernest Mandel remarked, "Marxism is always open, always critical, always self-critical." Classical Marxism distinguishes Marxism as broadly perceived from "what Marx believed." In 1883, Marx wrote to his son-in-law Paul Lafargue and French labour leader Jules Guesde—both of whom claimed to represent Marxist principles—accusing them of "revolutionary phrase-mongering" and denying the value of reformist struggle. From Marx's letter derives the paraphrase, "If that is Marxism, then I am not a Marxist." Accusing Guesde and Lafargue of "revolutionary phrase-mongering" and "of denying the value of reformist struggles, Marx made his famous remark that, if their politics represented Marxism, '' ('what is certain is that I myself am not a Marxist')."

American Marxist scholar Hal Draper responded: "There are few thinkers in modern history whose thought has been so badly misrepresented, by Marxists and anti-Marxists alike."

Libertarian 

Libertarian Marxism emphasizes the anti-authoritarian and libertarian aspects of Marxism. Early currents of libertarian Marxism, such as left communism, emerged in opposition to Marxism–Leninism.

Libertarian Marxism is often critical of reformist positions such as those held by social democrats. Along with anarchism, libertarian Marxism is one of the main currents of libertarian socialism.

Libertarian Marxism includes currents such as autonomism, council communism, De Leonism, Lettrism, parts of the New Left, Situationism, Freudo-Marxism (a form of psychoanalysis), Socialisme ou Barbarie and workerism. Libertarian Marxism has often strongly influenced both post-left and social anarchists. Notable theorists of libertarian Marxism have included Maurice Brinton, Cornelius Castoriadis, Guy Debord, Raya Dunayevskaya, Daniel Guérin, C. L. R. James, Rosa Luxemburg, Antonio Negri, Anton Pannekoek, Fredy Perlman, Ernesto Screpanti, E. P. Thompson, Raoul Vaneigem, and Yanis Varoufakis, the latter claiming that Marx himself was a libertarian Marxist.

Humanist 

Marxist humanism was born in 1932 with the publication of Marx's Economic and Philosophic Manuscripts of 1844 and reached a degree of prominence in the 1950s and 1960s. Marxist humanists contend that there is continuity between the early philosophical writings of Marx, in which he develops his theory of alienation, and the structural description of capitalist society found in his later works, such as Capital. They hold that grasping Marx's philosophical foundations is necessary to understand his later works properly.

Contrary to the official dialectical materialism of the Soviet Union and interpretations of Marx rooted in the structural Marxism of Louis Althusser, Marxist humanists argue that Marx's work was an extension or transcendence of enlightenment humanism. Whereas other Marxist philosophies see Marxism as natural science, Marxist humanism reaffirms the doctrine that "man is the measure of all things"—that humans are essentially different to the rest of the natural order and should be treated so by Marxist theory.

Academic 

According to a 2007 survey of American professors by Neil Gross and Solon Simmons, 17.6% of social science professors and 5.0% of humanities professors identify as Marxists, while between 0 and 2% of professors in all other disciplines identify as Marxists.

Archaeology 

The theoretical development of Marxist archaeology was first developed in the Soviet Union in 1929, when a young archaeologist named Vladislav I. Ravdonikas published a report entitled "For a Soviet history of material culture"; within this work, the very discipline of archaeology as it then stood was criticised as being inherently bourgeois, therefore anti-socialist and so, as a part of the academic reforms instituted in the Soviet Union under the administration of General Secretary Joseph Stalin, a great emphasis was placed on the adoption of Marxist archaeology throughout the country.

These theoretical developments were subsequently adopted by archaeologists working in capitalist states outside of the Leninist bloc, most notably by the Australian academic V. Gordon Childe, who used Marxist theory in his understandings of the development of human society.

Sociology 

Marxist sociology, as the study of sociology from a Marxist perspective, is "a form of conflict theory associated with ... Marxism's objective of developing a positive (empirical) science of capitalist society as part of the mobilization of a revolutionary working class." The American Sociological Association has a section dedicated to the issues of Marxist sociology that is "interested in examining how insights from Marxist methodology and Marxist analysis can help explain the complex dynamics of modern society."

Influenced by the thought of Karl Marx, Marxist sociology emerged in the late 19th and early 20th centuries. As well as Marx, Max Weber and Émile Durkheim are considered seminal influences in early sociology. The first Marxist school of sociology was known as Austro-Marxism, of which Carl Grünberg and Antonio Labriola were among its most notable members. During the 1940s, the Western Marxist school became accepted within Western academia, subsequently fracturing into several different perspectives, such as the Frankfurt School or critical theory. Due to its former state-supported position, there has been a backlash against Marxist thought in post-communist states (see sociology in Poland). However, it remains dominant in the sociological research sanctioned and supported by communist states (see sociology in China).

Economics 

Marxian economics is a school of economic thought tracing its foundations to the critique of classical political economy first expounded upon by Karl Marx and Friedrich Engels. Marxian economics concerns itself with the analysis of crisis in capitalism, the role and distribution of the surplus product and surplus value in various types of economic systems, the nature and origin of economic value, the impact of class and class struggle on economic and political processes, and the process of economic evolution. Although the Marxian school is considered heterodox, ideas that have come out of Marxian economics have contributed to mainstream understanding of the global economy. Certain concepts of Marxian economics, especially those related to capital accumulation and the business cycle, such as creative destruction, have been fitted for use in capitalist systems.

Education 
Marxist education develops Marx's works and those of the movements he influenced in various ways. In addition to the educational psychology of Lev Vygotsky and the pedagogy of Paulo Freire, Samuel Bowles and Herbert Gintis' Schooling in Capitalist America is a study of educational reform in the U.S. and its relationship to the reproduction of capitalism and the possibilities of utilizing its contradictions in the revolutionary movement. The work of Peter McLaren, especially since the turn of the 21st century, has further developed Marxist educational theory by developing revolutionary critical pedagogy, as has the work of Glenn Rikowski, Dave Hill, and Paula Allman. Other Marxists have analyzed the forms and pedagogical processes of capitalist and communist education, such as Tyson E. Lewis, Noah De Lissovoy, Gregory Bourassa, and Derek R. Ford. Curry Malott has developed a Marxist history of education in the U.S., and Marvin Gettleman examined the history of communist education. Sandy Grande has synthesized Marxist educational theory with Indigenous pedagogy, while others like John Holt analyze adult education from a Marxist perspective.

Other developments include:

 the educational aesthetics of Marxist education
 Marxist analyses of the role of fixed capital in capitalist education
 the educational psychology of capital 
 the educational theory of Lenin
 the pedagogical function of the Communist Party

The latest field of research examines and develops Marxist pedagogy in the postdigital era.

Historiography 

Marxist historiography is a school of historiography influenced by Marxism, the chief tenets of which are the centrality of social class and economic constraints in determining historical outcomes. Marxist historiography has contributed to the history of the working class, oppressed nationalities, and the methodology of history from below. Friedrich Engels' most important historical contribution was Der deutsche Bauernkrieg about the German Peasants' War which analysed social warfare in early Protestant Germany regarding emerging capitalist classes. The German Peasants' War indicates the Marxist interest in history from below with class analysis and attempts a dialectical analysis.

Engels' short treatise The Condition of the Working Class in England in 1844 was salient in creating the socialist impetus in British politics. Marx's most important works on social and political history include The Eighteenth Brumaire of Louis Napoleon, The Communist Manifesto, The German Ideology, and those chapters of Das Kapital dealing with the historical emergence of capitalists and proletarians from pre-industrial English society. Marxist historiography suffered in the Soviet Union as the government requested overdetermined historical writing. Notable histories include the History of the Communist Party of the Soviet Union (Bolsheviks), published in the 1930s to justify the nature of Bolshevik party life under Joseph Stalin. A circle of historians inside the Communist Party of Great Britain (CPGB) formed in 1946.

While some members of the group, most notably Christopher Hill and E. P. Thompson, left the CPGB after the 1956 Hungarian Revolution, the common points of British Marxist historiography continued in their works. Thompson's The Making of the English Working Class is one of the works commonly associated with this group. Eric Hobsbawm's Bandits is another example of this group's work. C. L. R. James was also a great pioneer of the 'history from below' approach. Living in Britain when he wrote his most notable work, The Black Jacobins (1938), he was an anti-Stalinist Marxist and so outside of the CPGB. In India, B. N. Datta and D. D. Kosambi are the founding fathers of Marxist historiography. Today, the senior-most scholars of Marxist historiography are R. S. Sharma, Irfan Habib, Romila Thapar, D. N. Jha, and K. N. Panikkar, most of whom are now over 75 years old.

Literary criticism 

Marxist literary criticism is a loose term describing literary criticism based on socialist and dialectic theories. Marxist criticism views literary works as reflections of the social institutions from which they originate. According to Marxists, even literature is a social institution with a specific ideological function based on the background and ideology of the author. Marxist literary critics include Mikhail Bakhtin, Walter Benjamin, Terry Eagleton, and Fredric Jameson.

Aesthetics 

Marxist aesthetics is a theory of aesthetics based on or derived from the theories of Karl Marx. It involves a dialectical and materialist, or dialectical materialist, approach to the application of Marxism to the cultural sphere, specifically areas related to taste, such as art and beauty, among others. Marxists believe that economic and social conditions, and especially the class relations that derive from them affect every aspect of an individual's life, from religious beliefs to legal systems to cultural frameworks. Some notable Marxist aestheticians include Anatoly Lunacharsky, Mikhail Lifshitz, William Morris, Theodor W. Adorno, Bertolt Brecht, Herbert Marcuse, Walter Benjamin, Antonio Gramsci, Georg Lukács, Ernst Fischer, Louis Althusser, Jacques Rancière, Maurice Merleau-Ponty, and Raymond Williams.

History

Karl Marx and Friedrich Engels 

Marx addressed the alienation and exploitation of the working class, the capitalist mode of production and historical materialism. He is famous for analysing history in terms of class struggle, summarised in the initial line introducing The Communist Manifesto (1848): "The history of all hitherto existing society is the history of class struggles."

Together with Marx, Engels co-developed communist theory. Marx and Engels first met in September 1844. Discovering that they had similar views of philosophy and socialism, they collaborated and wrote works such as Die heilige Familie (The Holy Family). After Marx was deported from France in January 1845, they moved to Belgium, which permitted greater freedom of expression than other European countries. In January 1846, they returned to Brussels to establish the Communist Correspondence Committee.

In 1847, they began writing The Communist Manifesto (1848), based on Engels' The Principles of Communism. Six weeks later, they published the 12,000-word pamphlet in February 1848. In March, Belgium expelled them, and they moved to Cologne, where they published the Neue Rheinische Zeitung, a politically radical newspaper. By 1849, they had to leave Cologne for London. The Prussian authorities pressured the British government to expel Marx and Engels, but Prime Minister Lord John Russell refused.

After Marx died in 1883, Engels became the editor and translator of Marx's writings. With his Origins of the Family, Private Property, and the State (1884)—analysing monogamous marriage as guaranteeing male social domination of women, a concept analogous, in communist theory, to the capitalist class's economic domination of the working class—Engels made intellectually significant contributions to feminist theory and Marxist feminism.

Russian Revolution and the Soviet Union 

With the October Revolution in 1917, the Bolsheviks took power from the Russian Provisional Government. The Bolsheviks established the first socialist state based on the ideas of soviet democracy and Leninism. Their newly formed federal state promised to end Russian involvement in World War I and establish a revolutionary worker's state. Following the October Revolution, the Soviet government struggled with the White Movement and several independence movements in the Russian Civil War. This period is marked by the establishment of many socialist policies and the development of new socialist ideas, mainly in the form of Marxism–Leninism.

In 1919, the nascent Soviet Government established the Communist Academy and the Marx–Engels–Lenin Institute for doctrinal Marxist study and to publish official ideological and research documents for the Russian Communist Party. With Lenin's death in 1924, there was an internal struggle in the Soviet Communist movement, mainly between Joseph Stalin and Leon Trotsky, in the form of the Right Opposition and Left Opposition, respectively. These struggles were based on both sides' different interpretations of Marxist and Leninist theory based on the situation of the Soviet Union at the time.

Chinese Revolution 

At the end of the Second Sino-Japanese War and, more widely, World War II, the Chinese Communist Revolution occurred within the context of the Chinese Civil War. The Chinese Communist Party, founded in 1921, conflicted with the Kuomintang over the country's future. Throughout the Civil War, Mao Zedong developed a theory of Marxism for the Chinese historical context. Mao found a large base of support in the peasantry as opposed to the Russian Revolution, which found its primary support in the urban centres of the Russian Empire. Some significant ideas contributed by Mao were the ideas of New Democracy, mass line and people's war. The People's Republic of China (PRC) was declared in 1949. The new socialist state was to be founded on the ideas of Marx, Engels, Lenin and Stalin.

From Stalin's death until the late 1960s, there was increased conflict between China and the Soviet Union. De-Stalinization, which first began under Nikita Khrushchev, and the policy of detente, were seen as revisionist and insufficiently Marxist. This ideological confrontation spilt into a broader global crisis centred around which nation was to lead the international socialist movement.

Following Mao's death and the ascendancy of Deng Xiaoping, Maoism and official Marxism in China were reworked. This new model was a newer dynamic form of Marxism–Leninism and Maoism in China. Commonly referred to as socialism with Chinese Characteristics, this new path was centred around Deng's Four Cardinal Principles, which sought to uphold the central role of the Chinese Communist Party and uphold the principle that China was in the primary stage of socialism and that it was still working to build a communist society based on Marxist principles.

Late 20th century 

In 1959, the Cuban Revolution led to the victory of Fidel Castro and his July 26 Movement. Although the revolution was not explicitly socialist, upon victory, Castro ascended to the position of prime minister and adopted the Leninist model of socialist development, allying with the Soviet Union. One of the leaders of the revolution, the Argentine Marxist revolutionary Che Guevara, subsequently went on to aid revolutionary socialist movements in Congo-Kinshasa and Bolivia, eventually being killed by the Bolivian government, possibly on the orders of the Central Intelligence Agency (CIA), although the CIA agent sent to search for Guevara, Felix Rodriguez, expressed a desire to keep him alive as a possible bargaining tool with the Cuban government. He posthumously went on to become an internationally recognised icon.

In the People's Republic of China, the Maoist government undertook the Cultural Revolution from 1966 to 1976 to purge Chinese society of capitalist elements and achieve socialism. Upon Mao Zedong's death, his rivals seized political power, and under the leadership of Deng Xiaoping, many of Mao's Cultural Revolution era policies were revised or abandoned, and much of the state sector was privatised.

The late 1980s and early 1990s saw the collapse of most of those socialist states that had professed a Marxist–Leninist ideology. In the late 1970s and early 1980s, the emergence of the New Right and neoliberal capitalism as the dominant ideological trends in Western politics championed by United States president Ronald Reagan and British prime minister Margaret Thatcher led the West to take a more aggressive stance towards the Soviet Union and its Leninist allies. Meanwhile, the reformist Mikhael Gorbachev became General Secretary of the Communist Party of the Soviet Union in March 1985 and sought to abandon Leninist development models toward social democracy. Ultimately, Gorbachev's reforms, coupled with rising levels of popular ethnic nationalism, led to the dissolution of the Soviet Union in late 1991 into a series of constituent nations, all of which abandoned Marxist–Leninist models for socialism, with most converting to capitalist economies.

21st century 

At the turn of the 21st century, China, Cuba, Laos, North Korea, and Vietnam remained the only officially Marxist–Leninist states remaining, although a Maoist government led by Prachanda was elected into power in Nepal in 2008 following a long guerrilla struggle.

The early 21st century also saw the election of socialist governments in several Latin American nations, in what has come to be known as the "pink tide"; dominated by the Venezuelan government of Hugo Chávez; this trend also saw the election of Evo Morales in Bolivia, Rafael Correa in Ecuador, and Daniel Ortega in Nicaragua. Forging political and economic alliances through international organisations like the Bolivarian Alliance for the Americas, these socialist governments allied themselves with Marxist–Leninist Cuba. Although none espoused a Stalinist path directly, most admitted to being significantly influenced by Marxist theory. Venezuelan president Hugo Chávez declared himself a Trotskyist during the swearing-in of his cabinet two days before his inauguration on 10 January 2007. Venezuelan Trotskyist organizations do not regard Chávez as a Trotskyist, with some describing him as a bourgeois nationalist, while others consider him an honest revolutionary leader who made significant mistakes due to him lacking a Marxist analysis.

For Italian Marxist Gianni Vattimo and Santiago Zabala in their 2011 book Hermeneutic Communism, "this new weak communism differs substantially from its previous Soviet (and current Chinese) realization, because the South American countries follow democratic electoral procedures and also manage to decentralize the state bureaucratic system through the Bolivarian missions. In sum, if weakened communism is felt as a specter in the West, it is not only because of media distortions but also for the alternative it represents through the same democratic procedures that the West constantly professes to cherish but is hesitant to apply."

Chinese Communist Party General Secretary Xi Jinping has announced a deepening commitment of the Chinese Communist Party to the ideas of Marx. At an event celebrating the 200th anniversary of Marx's birth, Xi said, "We must win the advantages, win the initiative, and win the future. We must continuously improve the ability to use Marxism to analyse and solve practical problems", adding that Marxism is a "powerful ideological weapon for us to understand the world, grasp the law, seek the truth, and change the world." Xi has further stressed the importance of examining and continuing the tradition of the CPC and embracing its revolutionary past.

The fidelity of those varied revolutionaries, leaders and parties to the work of Karl Marx is highly contested and has been rejected by many Marxists and other socialists alike. Socialists in general and socialist writers, including Dimitri Volkogonov, acknowledge that the actions of authoritarian socialist leaders have damaged "the enormous appeal of socialism generated by the October Revolution."

Criticism 

Criticism of Marxism has come from various political ideologies and academic disciplines. This includes general criticism about lack of internal consistency, criticisms related to historical materialism, that it is a type of historical determinism, the necessity of suppression of individual rights, issues with the implementation of communism and economic issues such as the distortion or absence of price signals and reduced incentives. In addition, empirical and epistemological problems are frequently identified.

Some Marxists have criticised the academic institutionalisation of Marxism for being too shallow and detached from political action. Zimbabwean Trotskyist Alex Callinicos, himself a professional academic, stated: "Its practitioners remind one of Narcissus, who in the Greek legend fell in love with his own reflection. ... Sometimes it is necessary to devote time to clarifying and developing the concepts that we use, but indeed for Western Marxists this has become an end in itself. The result is a body of writings incomprehensible to all but a tiny minority of highly qualified scholars."

Additionally, some intellectual critiques of Marxism contest certain assumptions prevalent in Marx's thought and Marxism after him without rejecting Marxist politics. Other contemporary supporters of Marxism argue that many aspects of Marxist thought are viable but that the corpus is incomplete or outdated regarding certain aspects of economic, political or social theory. They may combine some Marxist concepts with the ideas of other theorists such as Max Weber—the Frankfurt School is one example.

General 
Philosopher and historian of ideas Leszek Kołakowski pointed out that "Marx's theory is incomplete or ambiguous in many places, and could be 'applied' in many contradictory ways without manifestly infringing its principles." Specifically, he considers "the laws of dialectics" as fundamentally erroneous, stating that some are "truisms with no specific Marxist content", others "philosophical dogmas that cannot be proved by scientific means", and some just "nonsense"; he believes that some Marxist laws can be interpreted differently, but that these interpretations still in general fall into one of the two categories of error.

Okishio's theorem shows that if capitalists use cost-cutting techniques and real wages do not increase, the rate of profit must rise, which casts doubt on Marx's view that the rate of profit would tend to fall.

The allegations of inconsistency have been a large part of Marxian economics and the debates around it since the 1970s. Andrew Kliman argues that this undermines Marx's critiques and the correction of the alleged inconsistencies because internally inconsistent theories cannot be correct by definition.

Epistemological and empirical 
Critics of Marxism claim that Marx's predictions have failed, with some pointing towards the GDP per capita generally increasing in capitalist economies compared to less market-oriented economics, the capitalist economies not suffering worsening economic crises leading to the overthrow of the capitalist system and communist revolutions not occurring in the most advanced capitalist nations, but instead in undeveloped regions. It has also been criticized for allegedly resulting in lower living standards in relation to capitalist countries, a claim that has been disputed.

In his books, The Poverty of Historicism and Conjectures and Refutations, philosopher of science Karl Popper criticized the explanatory power and validity of historical materialism. Popper believed that Marxism had been initially scientific in that Marx had postulated a genuinely predictive theory. When these predictions were not borne out, Popper argues that the theory avoided falsification by adding ad hoc hypotheses that made it compatible with the facts. Because of this, Popper asserted, a theory that was initially genuinely scientific degenerated into pseudoscientific dogma.

Socialist 

Democratic socialists and social democrats reject the idea that socialism can be accomplished only through extra-legal class conflict and a proletarian revolution. The relationship between Marx and other socialist thinkers and organizations—rooted in Marxism's "scientific" and anti-utopian socialism, among other factors—has divided Marxists from other socialists since Marx's life.

After Marx's death and the emergence of Marxism, there have also been dissensions within Marxism itself—a notable example is the splitting of the Russian Social Democratic Labour Party into Bolsheviks and Mensheviks. Orthodox Marxists opposed a less dogmatic, more innovative, or even revisionist Marxism.

Anarchist and libertarian 

Anarchism has had a strained relationship with Marxism. Anarchists and many non-Marxist libertarian socialists reject the need for a transitory state phase, claiming that socialism can only be established through decentralized, non-coercive organization. Anarchist Mikhail Bakunin criticized Marx for his authoritarian bent. The phrases "barracks socialism" or "barracks communism" became shorthand for this critique, evoking the image of citizens' lives being as regimented as the lives of conscripts in barracks.

Economic 
Other critiques come from an economic standpoint. Vladimir Karpovich Dmitriev writing in 1898, Ladislaus von Bortkiewicz writing in 1906–1907, and subsequent critics have alleged that Marx's value theory and the law of the tendency of the rate of profit to fall are internally inconsistent. In other words, the critics allege that Marx drew conclusions that do not follow his theoretical premises. Once these alleged errors are corrected, his conclusion that aggregate price and profit are determined by and equal to the aggregate value and surplus value no longer holds. This result calls into question his theory that exploiting workers is the sole source of profit.

Marxism and socialism have received considerable critical analysis from multiple generations of Austrian economists regarding scientific methodology, economic theory and political implications. During the marginal revolution, subjective value theory was rediscovered by Carl Menger, a development that fundamentally undermined the British cost theories of value. The restoration of subjectivism and praxeological methodology previously used by classical economists including Richard Cantillon, Anne-Robert-Jacques Turgot, Jean-Baptiste Say and Frédéric Bastiat led Menger to criticise historicist methodology in general. Second-generation Austrian economist Eugen Böhm von Bawerk used praxeological and subjectivist methodology to fundamentally attack the law of value. Gottfried Haberler has regarded his criticism as "definitive", arguing that Böhm-Bawerk's critique of Marx's economics was so "thorough and devastating" that he believes that as of the 1960s, no Marxian scholar had conclusively refuted it. Third-generation Austrian Ludwig von Mises rekindled the debate about the economic calculation problem by arguing that without price signals in capital goods, in his opinion, all other aspects of the market economy are irrational. This led him to declare that "rational economic activity is impossible in a socialist commonwealth."

Daron Acemoglu and James A. Robinson argue that Marx's economic theory was fundamentally flawed because it attempted to simplify the economy into a few general laws that ignored the impact of institutions on the economy.

See also 

 Communism
 Influences on Karl Marx
 Marx's theory of human nature
 Marxian class theory
 Marxists Internet Archive
 Outline of Marxism
 Post-Marxism
 Marxian economics

References

Citations

Bibliography

Further reading

External links 

 
Communism
Criticism of religion
Democratic socialism
Eponymous economic ideologies
Eponymous political ideologies
Karl Marx
Left-wing ideologies
Sociological theories
Socialism
Social democracy
Social theories
Theories of history
Types of socialism
Historical materialism